Nikola Jorgić (1946 – 8 June 2014) was a Bosnian Serb from the Doboj region who was a soldier of a paramilitary group located in his native area. On 26 September 1997, he was convicted of genocide in Germany. This was the first conviction won against participants in the Bosnian Genocide. Jorgić was sentenced to four terms of life imprisonment for his involvement in the Bosnian genocide.

Background
 
The Oberlandesgericht found that the paramilitary group had joined in the Bosnian Serb government's activities. Jorgić, who had been a resident of Germany from May 1969 until 1992, was responsible for multiple crimes. Among his actions was the massacre in Grabska, where 22 villagers - including the elderly and disabled - were executed before the rest of the villagers were expelled. He was also deemed responsible for the death of seven villagers in Sevarlije. His appeal following his conviction was rejected by the German Bundesgerichtshof (Federal Supreme Court) on 30 April 1999. The court stated that genocide is a crime which all nations must prosecute. On 12 July 2007, European Court of Human Rights dismissed Jorgić's appeal.

Footnotes

References
 Federal High Court of Germany: Translation of Press Release into English Nr. 39 on 30 April 1999: Federal High Court makes basic ruling on genocide, Prevent Genocide International

Further reading
Lost War Criminals, cin.ba; accessed 5 August 2015. 
 Nikola Jorgić (photo) (B&H Centre for Investigative Journalism); accessed 5 August 2015. 

Article 7 of the European Convention on Human Rights
European Court of Human Rights cases involving Germany
Army of Republika Srpska soldiers
Prisoners sentenced to life imprisonment by Germany
Bosnia and Herzegovina prisoners sentenced to life imprisonment
Serbs of Bosnia and Herzegovina convicted of genocide
1946 births
2014 deaths
People from Doboj
Date of birth missing